Annie Jackson may refer to:

Annie May Jackson, first female police officer in Canada
Annie Jackson-Camden, 7th Heaven character

See also
Anne Jackson (disambiguation)
Jackson (name)